Julio Bolbochán (Buenos Aires, 20 March 1920 – Caracas, 28 June 1996) was the Argentine chess champion in 1946 and 1948.

He learned the game from his older brother, Jacobo Bolbochán, later an International Master.

He represented Argentina in seven Chess Olympiads from 1950 to 1970.
Bolbochán earned the International Master title in 1950 and the International Grandmaster title in 1977.

He had several successes at Mar del Plata: shared first with Erich Eliskases in 1951, shared first with Héctor Rossetto in 1952, and shared first with Miguel Najdorf in 1956.

Bolbochán qualified to play in the Sousse interzonal but didn't participate due to the Argentine Chess Federation not having enough funds to send him.

After 1976 he lived as a chess teacher in Venezuela.

He represented Venezuela in the 1977 Maccabiah Games, 1981 Maccabiah Games, 1985 Maccabiah Games, and 1989 Maccabiah Games. He was the chess coach at the Universidad Simón Bolívar Chess Club for over 20 years.

Games

Here is his victory in Bolbochán-Larry Evans in the 1952 Chess Olympiad in Helsinki:
1. d4 d5 2. c4 dxc4 3. Nf3 a6 4. e3 Nf6 5. Bxc4 e6 6. O-O c5 7. Qe2 Nc6 8. Nc3 b5 9. Bb3 cxd4 10. exd4 Nxd4 11. Nxd4 Qxd4 12. Nd5 Nxd5 13. Rd1 Nc3 14. bxc3 Qb6 15. Qe5 Bb7 16. Be3 Qc6 17. Bd5 Qc8 18. Bxb7 Qxb7 19. a4 Rc8 20. axb5 Qxb5 21. Qd4 e5 22. Qg4 Rd8 23. Rxd8+ Kxd8 24. Rd1+ Ke7 25. Qf5 1–0.

References

External links
 
 

1920 births
1996 deaths
Sportspeople from Buenos Aires
Chess grandmasters
Chess Olympiad competitors
Argentine chess players
Venezuelan chess players
Jewish chess players
Argentine Jews
Competitors at the 1977 Maccabiah Games
Competitors at the 1981 Maccabiah Games
Competitors at the 1985 Maccabiah Games
Competitors at the 1989 Maccabiah Games
Maccabiah Games chess players
Maccabiah Games competitors for Argentina
20th-century chess players